Anne Ward may refer to:

 Anne Ward (suffragist) (1825–1896), temperance leader and welfare worker in New Zealand
 Anne V. Ward (1877–1971), Scottish-born American educator
 Ann Ward (printer) Ann Ward (1715–1789), printer of The York Courant newspaper and The Life and Opinions of Tristram Shandy, Gentleman
 Ann Ward (born 1991), American fashion model
 Ann Ward Radcliffe, née Ann Ward, author
 Ann Hould-Ward, costume designer